Cnephalocotes is a genus of dwarf spiders that was first described by Eugène Louis Simon in 1884.  it contains four species:C. ferrugineus, C. obscurus, C. simpliciceps and C. tristis.

See also
 List of Linyphiidae species

References

Araneomorphae genera
Holarctic spiders
Linyphiidae
Spiders of Europe
Spiders of Hawaii